Ronnie Vicente Conde Lagnada (born November 27, 1962), known as Ronnie Vic, simplified as RCL, is a Filipino civil engineer and politician who is the 14th and incumbent Mayor of Butuan. He is a member of the National Unity Party, and also the owner of Equi-Parco Construction Company.

Career

Political career 
Lagnada topped the FSUU Poll survey last April 2016, and became the Mayor of Butuan in 2016 after he defeated the previous mayor in a local election.

References

External links 
 

1962 births
Living people
Politicians from Agusan del Norte
People from Butuan
Visayan people
Filipino civil engineers
Mayors of places in Agusan del Norte
National Unity Party (Philippines) politicians
Nacionalista Party politicians
Xavier University – Ateneo de Cagayan alumni